Gluecifer is a Norwegian hard rock band based in Oslo. Formed in 1994, they produced several underground releases during their first years of existence and soon claimed to be "kings of rock".

History 
In 1997, the album Ridin' the Tiger (released on record label White Jazz) provided an artistic and commercial breakthrough and placed Gluecifer along Hellacopters from Sweden at the forefront of the Scandinavian hard rock wave of the late 1990s. Basement Apes, their fourth album, saw them signing with Sony Music, and Automatic Thrill became their biggest-selling record to date.

The band played at the 2004 Quart Festival as warmup for Monster Magnet.

In July 2005, the band announced their break-up.

Gluecifer counted as one of the most successful rock bands of Norway.

To the Norwegian Film Izzat Gluecifer contributed the Song Desolate City. The song was released on the compilation Kings of Rock – B-Sites and Rarities in 2008.

In 2006, Captain Poon started his new band Bloodlights.

In the film The Social Network the song Black Book Lodge can be heard as a part of the soundtrack.

On 9 October 2015, all regular studio albums by Gluecifer were re-released on Captain Poon's own label Konkurs Productions as LPs.

In 2016, Captain Poon was on tour as guitarist in Marky Ramone's Blitzkrieg.

In 2017, Gluecifer reunited for several festival shows in 2018 and reunion shows in their hometown Oslo.

Members

Current line-up 
Biff Malibu (Frithjof Jacobsen) – vocals (1994–2005, 2017– )
Captain Poon (Arne Skagen) – guitar, backing vocals (1994–2005, 2017– )
Raldo Useless (Rolf Yngve Uggen) – guitar, backing vocals (1996–2005, 2017– )
Peter Larsson – bass, backing vocals (2017– )
Danny Young – drums and percussion (1997–2005, 2017– )

Former members 
Kåre João Pedersen – guitar (1994–1995)
Sindre Wexelsen Goksøyr – guitar (1994–1996)
Anders Møller – drums and percussion (1994–1997)
Jon Average – bass, back vocals (1994–2000)
Stu Manx (Stig Amundsen) – bass, back vocals (2000–2005)

Discography

Albums 
 Ridin' The Tiger (1997)
 Soaring with Eagles at Night, to Rise with the Pigs in the Morning (1998)
 Tender Is the Savage (2000)
 Basement Apes (2002)
 Automatic Thrill (2004)

Singles 
 "God's Chosen Dealer" (1995)
 "Leather Chair" (1997)
 "Shitty City" (1997)
 "Dambuster" (1997)
 "Mano-a-Mano" (1998)
 "Lard Ass Hagen" (1998)
 "Go Away Man / Rockthrone" (1998)
 "Get the Horn" (1998)
 "The Year of Manly Living" (1998)
 "Boiler Trip" [Splitsingle Gluecifer/Electric Frankenstein] (1998)
 "Rock N' Roll Asshole / Evil Matcher" (1998)
 "Get That Psycho Out of My Face" (1999)
 "Rock & Roll" [Splitsingle Gluecifer/Murder City Devils] (1999)
 "Lord of the Dusk / Titanium Sunset" (1999)
 "The General Says Hell Yeah" (2000)
 "Easy Living" (2002)
 "Losing End" (2002)
 "Reversed" (2002)
 "A Call from the Other Side" (2004)
 "Here Come the Pigs" (2004)

EPs and compilations 
 Dick Disguised as Pussy
  Gary O'Kane 
 Respect the Rock America
 Head to Head Boredom
 Nineteen Inches of Rock (1996)
 Get the Horn (2000)
 Respect the Rock (2002)
 Ritual Savage (2003)
 Best of and Rarities (2008)

References

External links 

 Official website (archived)
 Fansite (archived)

Norwegian hard rock musical groups
Norwegian punk rock groups
Norwegian rock music groups
Post-punk revival music groups
Musical groups established in 1994
1994 establishments in Norway
Musical groups disestablished in 2005
2017 establishments in Norway
Musical groups from Oslo